Bernard Malcolm Devitt (26 January 1937 – 12 February 2012) was an English professional footballer who played as an inside forward.

Career
Born in Bradford, Devitt began his career at Bradford Rovers, before turning professional in 1958 with Bradford City, making 100 appearances in the Football League over the next five years. He later played non-league football with Wisbech Town, and holds their Southern League match appearance record with 246 games, from a total of 385 first team appearances.

Later life and death
Devitt retired to Cyprus, and died on 12 February 2012 aged 74 following a fall.

References

1937 births
2012 deaths
English footballers
Bradford City A.F.C. players
Wisbech Town F.C. players
English Football League players
Association football inside forwards
Footballers from Bradford